Kian Soltani (born 3 June 1992) is an Austrian-Iranian cellist, born in Bregenz to a family of Iranian musicians. He has held the post of principal cellist in Daniel Barenboim's West-Eastern Divan Orchestra, where he came to prominence performing Beethoven's Triple Concerto on the orchestra's 2015 tour.

He began playing the cello at the age of four and, at age 12 he began his studies with Ivan Monighetti at Basel Music Academy. He completed his studies as a member of the Young Soloist Programme at the Kronberg Academy in Taunus, Germany, and the International Music Academy in Liechtenstein. He is currently artist in residence at the Residentie Orchestra in The Hague for the 2018-2019 season.

Awards and competitions 
Soltani was awarded the Lucerne Festival's 2017 Credit Suisse Young Artist Award and the Schleswig-Holstein Musik Festival’s 2017 Bernstein Award. He received the Luitpold Prize (German: Luitpoldpreis) of the Festival Kissinger Sommer in 2014. In 2013, he won the first prize at the Paulo Cello Competition in Helsinki, Finland. He has also won the first prize in the Karl Davidoff International Cello Competition in Latvia and the International Cello Competition 'Antonio Janigro' in Croatia, and became a member of the Anne-Sophie Mutter Foundation in 2014.

Recordings 

Kian Soltani signed an exclusive recording contract with Deutsche Grammophon/Universal Classics in 2017. His debut album Home was released in February 2018, and pairs works by Schubert and Schumann with folk song settings by Reza Vali and Soltani himself.

References

External links
 Kian Soltani's Personal website
 Kian Soltani on the Intermusica website

Living people
Deutsche Grammophon artists
1992 births
Austrian classical cellists
People from Bregenz
Austrian people of Iranian descent
21st-century Austrian musicians
21st-century classical musicians
21st-century male musicians
21st-century cellists